The Stolp SA-900 V-Star is an American aerobatic homebuilt biplane, currently produced by Aircraft Spruce & Specialty Co in the form of plans for amateur construction. In the 1990s it was also available as a kit from Stolp Starduster Corporation of Riverside, California.

Design and development
The V-Star was designed as a low-cost, economical and easy to fly design, with a light wing loading and short runway requirements. It features a strut-braced biplane layout, with cabane struts, interplane struts and flying wires, a single-seat open cockpit, fixed conventional landing gear with wheel pants and a single engine in tractor configuration.

The aircraft fuselage is made from welded 4130 steel tubing. Its  span wings are made from spruce and plywood, with the whole aircraft covered with doped aircraft fabric. The engine used is the  Continental A65 or other similar powerplants.

The designer estimates the construction time from the kit that was available in the 1990s as 1800 hours.

Operational history
By 1998 the company reported that 65 aircraft were completed and flying.

In March 2014, 13 examples were registered in the United States with the Federal Aviation Administration, although a total of 24 had been registered at one time. In Canada in March 2014 there were two registered with Transport Canada and in the United Kingdom a further two were registered with the CAA.

Specifications (V-Star)

See also
List of aerobatic aircraft

References

External links

Official website

SA900 V-Star
1990s United States sport aircraft
Single-engined tractor aircraft
Biplanes
Homebuilt aircraft
Aerobatic aircraft